Judge Sykes may refer to:

Bryan Sykes (judge) (fl. 2010s–2020s), Chief Justice of Jamaica
Diane S. Sykes (born 1957), judge of the United States Court of Appeals for the Seventh Circuit and justice of the Wisconsin Supreme Court
Sunshine Sykes (born 1974), judge of the United States District Court for the Central District of California